Yvette Tsui (born 1 May 1963) is a Taiwanese former television host.

Personal life
Yvette Tsui's family was from Yantai. She spent her youth in Nuannuan, Keelung.

Tsui married Lee Chen-chia, an employee of China Television who was ten years older than she was, in 1991. Tsui moved from Neihu District to Tianmu, Shilin District, in 1997. She retired in 2004, after a twenty five-year career, and moved to Vancouver with her husband. Tsui stated in 2013 that she would return to Taiwan to care for her parents after her daughter started college. She later moved to Singapore.

References

1963 births
Living people
People from Taipei
Taiwanese expatriates in Canada
Taiwanese television presenters
Taiwanese expatriates in Singapore
People from Keelung
Taiwanese women television presenters